The Manawatu Rugby Football Union (MRU) is the governing body of the sport of rugby union in the Manawatū-Whanganui region of New Zealand.

Founded in 1886, Manawatu is one of New Zealand's oldest rugby unions. In 1892, the MRU, amongst other unions, was instrumental in the founding of the New Zealand Rugby Union (NZRU).

The union is based in the city of Palmerston North though its catchment area includes players and clubs from nearby towns in the province, including Ashhurst, Feilding, Rongotea, Linton, Bulls, Pahiatua, Woodville and Dannevirke. It has over 5,000 players, making it the tenth largest union in New Zealand in terms of player numbers. In 2011, the union celebrated its 125th jubilee.

Manawatu have traditionally played in a distinctive green and white tramline jersey, which is thought to have been established in 1909. In 1996, a jersey including red was worn, and colors worn have varied since the union was formed.

The union's home ground is Central Energy Trust Arena.

History
The Manawatu rugby union was formed on 17 April 1886 at Palmerston North, with the founding clubs being: Palmerston, Feilding and Foxton. It was initially named the Manawatu County Union but was renamed in 1888. The sport had been introduced to the area by a few players from Wanganui, who had moved into the region. Following the unions establishment many other clubs were formed as the sport became more popular.

Early years

The first recorded match in the Manawatu took place on 13 July 1878. A Feilding side faced a "Rangitikei Combined Clubs XV" which was played at Feilding.

The first Ranfurly Shield game Manawatu appeared in was in 1914. This was played against Taranaki at Pukekura Park. The match was lost 11–3 with William Carroll scoring a sole try. Their next challenge came ten years later, in 1924, where they would lose 31–5 to Hawke's Bay. Manawatu also provided J.F. Manning to referee a match in 1905 between Auckland and Wellington.

1970s and early 1980s: First division era and Ranfurly shield reign

The period from 1976 to 1983 saw Manawatu as one of the leading New Zealand rugby provinces. In this period Manawatu consistently beat teams such as Otago, Auckland, Wellington and Canterbury. Manawatu held the Ranfurly Shield from 1976 to 1978 and this was followed by victory in the 1980 First Division Championship. Manawatu were also runner-up in 1976 and 1981. A large sign reading "Go! Go! Manawatu!" was lifted above Palmerston North Showgrounds Oval by crane.

Manawatu beat Auckland 12–10 at Eden Park in 1976 to win the coveted Log 'o Wood, as the Ranfurly Shield is sometimes referred to, for the first time. Doug Rollerson's dropped goal secured the famous victory for Manawatu. This led to a homecoming parade through the city streets.

With prop Kent Lambert sent-off, Manawatu were reduced to 14-men in their defense of the Ranfurly Shield against the Counties side in 1977. However, Manawatu rallied to record a victory 15–10. A last minute try prevented the confident Counties side from taking the Shield back to Pukekohe for the first time.

There was some controversy in 1977 when the Auckland rugby union had a request for a shield challenge that season denied by Manawatu who argued that Auckland had had 'too much influence in shield rugby for too long'.

In the final Ranfurly Shield challenge of the 1978 season Manawatu were leading North Auckland (now named Northland) 10–9 with time up on the clock. However, the referee, Bill Adlam, from Wanganui, played 5–6 minutes of 'injury' time before awarding the visitors a penalty, due to an offside, close to the posts. A penalty kick was successful and the shield was won by North Auckland. The referee then required a police escort off Showgrounds Oval (as it was known) while Manawatu fans showed their disgust and disappointment. Adlam claimed after the match that the game clock at the venue had not allocated for a couple of "lengthy" injury breaks, and so he rightly let the game go on. This was also backed up by a photographer who accurately timed the game.

Manawatu scored a 20–10 win over Australia in 1978.

In 1979 Auckland had won back the Ranfurly shield and denied Manawatu a challenge in 1980.

In 1980, during its championship winning season, Manawatu had eight All Blacks within the team.  They were: Mark Donaldson, Mark Shaw, Geoff Old, Frank Oliver, Gary Knight, Doug Rollerson, Lachie Cameron and Craig Wickes.

One of Manawatu's most memorable matches was the 1981 encounter against South Africa. Manawatu led 9–4 at halftime and with minutes to go the score was 19–19. The clash between the national champions and the 'test' strength Springboks was headed for a climax worthy of such an event. In the final analysis, Naas Botha was the difference between the two sides. In the final minutes he scored a long range penalty, a dropped goal and a sideline conversion to lead the 'Boks home to a flattering 31–19 victory. The Manawatu verses Springbok game was the first to witness the Police riot squads patrolling the streets as a pre-emptive measure, as opposed to them just turning up once trouble started. The day was generally incident free.

In 1983 the Canterbury Ranfurly Shield team put Manawatu last on their list of challengers for that season.

In 1985, Manawatu celebrated a centenary for its club competition and in 1986, the union's centenary.

Late 1980s to mid 2000s - second division

In 1988, the union was relegated to the second division for the first time. Manawatu, based in the second division, was reduced to a 'feeder' role, losing players to other unions.

Lee Stensness starred in a 58–24 win over Ireland in 1992.

In 1996 Manawatu and Hawke's Bay merged their teams to form the Central Vikings Rugby Union. It was an attempt to elevate both unions back to the first division. Players such as Mark Allen, Christian Cullen, Mark Ranby, Stephen Bachop and Roger Randle featured in the team. The 1997 season saw them finish second overall with 6 wins and 2 losses. This saw the team into the semi-finals. In the semi-final, the Vikings would go on to beat Bay of Plenty and came up against Northland in the final. Northland won the final 63–10. Northland were thus promoted to the first division. However, had the Vikings won, they would not have been eligible to be promoted.

1998 saw a repeat of form for the Vikings who went unbeaten in the season. They subsequently won the final against Bay of Plenty and were promoted to first division. However, due to financial issues, the merger split back to Manawatu and Hawke's Bay as separate unions.  Manawatu returned in 1999 to the second division.

Manawatu began the new millennium firmly fixed in the second-tier competition.

In 2005, Manawatu were heavily defeated 6–109 by the touring British and Irish Lions at Palmerston North.

2006 onwards - return to the first division

In 2005, Manawatu were invited along with four other unions, reduced to three after an amalgamation of Nelson Bays and Marlborough into Tasman, to play in the first division of a restructured National Provincial Championship, initially called (for sponsorship purposes) the Air New Zealand Cup. It was the first time since 1988 Manawatu had fielded a team in the top grade and unlike the 1980s it was now a professional rugby competition.

In 2009, Central Energy Trust Arena was the venue for a Highlanders home game against the Bulls from South Africa.

Fly-half Aaron Cruden was selected for the All Blacks in 2010. He was the first All Black chosen whilst playing for the union since Christian Cullen in 1996.

Manawatu hosted two matches during the 2011 Rugby World Cup.

In 2011, a resurgent Manawatu Turbos side defeated the Wellington Lions 31–25 in Wellington. It was Manawatu's first competition win over Wellington in the capital, after 124 years of trying.  Also in 2011, Manawatu scored 54 points against Waikato team at Arena Manawatu. The Turbos led 35–17 at halftime, eventually winning 54–20. This kept the Turbos unbeaten at home for the season.

In 2012, Manawatu scored its first victory away to North Harbor. The win at home against Hawke's Bay made Manawatu one of the few Championship teams to beat a Premiership team.

In 2012, Aaron Smith was selected in the All Blacks after fine performances with Manawatu and the Highlanders. Smith joining Aaron Cruden meant for the first time since 1986, two All Blacks came from Manawatu.

Club Rugby

The Manawatu rugby union includes the following clubs:

Hankins Shield Senior A Club competition winners

 1987 Varsity (coached by Murray Kendrick)
 1988 Varsity (Murray Kendrick)
 1989 HSOB (Ian Colquhoun)
 1990 College OB (Bill Clarke)
 1991 College OB (Bill Clarke)
 1992 Marist (Frank Oliver)
 1993 Kia Toa (Warren Hayne)
 1994 Feilding OB (Roger Walker)
 1995 Marist (John Fisher)
 1996 Oroua (Wayne Harding)
 1997 Te Kawau (Geoff Webb)
 1998 Marist (Mark Gleeson)
 1999 Te Kawau (Geoff Webb)
 2000 Te Kawau (Peter Kemp) 20-17 Marist
 2001 HSOB (Lewis Williams) 21-19 COB
 2002 Te Kawau (Stu Trembath) 16-11 Marist
 2003 Te Kawau (Stu Trembath) 23-16 Marist
 2004 Varsity (Steve Morris) 26-8 HSOB
 2005 College OB (Graeme Tanner) 27-16 Feilding Old Boys
 2006 College OB (Dean Andrew) 13-0 Varsity 
 2007 College OB (John Cruden) 33-18 Feilding 
 2008 Kia Toa (Tasi Tahuna) 11-6 Te Kawa
 2009 Kia Toa (Anthony Rehutai) 29-23 Varsity 
 2010 Varsity (Geoff Thompson) 11-10 Feilding Old Boys-Oroua
 2011 Varsity (Geoff Thompson) 29-27 Te Kawa
 2012 College OB (Aaron Good) 34-20 Varsity 
 2013 Kia Toa 37-15 Varsity 
 2014 College Old Boys 21-10 Kia Toa
 2015 College Old Boys 32-21 Kia Toa
 2016 Varsity 18-17 Kia Toa 
 2017 Old Boys Marist 28-27 Kia Toa
 2018 Feilding Old Boys-Oroua 24-22 Feilding 
 2019 Feilding 16-14 Varsity
 2020 Feilding 27-24 Varsity 
 2021 Feilding 22-18 Varsity
 2022 College Old Boys 24-5 Old Boys Marist

Manawatu representative players

Centurions - 100 matches for Manawatu

Manawatu All Blacks
In New Zealand, to be selected to the All Blacks is the pinnacle of rugby achievement. In its history, Manawatu have produced many players who have been selected for the national team.

{| class="wikitable" style="width:1000px; clear:right; margin:0 0 1em 1em; font-size:85%"
|-
! Player Name !! All Black Number !! Years !! Total matches (tests) !! Club !! Nickname!! About
|-
|Mark Allen ||933 || 1993–97 || 27 (8) || Massey University || "Bull" || A 'cult hero' and loosehead prop, he is more associated with his home province of Taranaki, from where he made his All Black debut.
However, in 1997, he moved to Manawatu, where he captained the Manawatu/Hawkes Bay Central Vikings. It was from this position that he played his one and only test match as a starting player (against England at Twickenham – his last test).
|-
|Keith Bagley ||548 || 1953–54 || 20 (0) || Kia Toa || || Retired at aged 23 to his family farm.
|-
|Robert (Bob) Burgess ||690 || 1971–73 || 30 (7) || Massey University || || Debuted for the All Blacks against the 1971 Lions. He was a stand out player in this series before being injured in the 3rd test which ended his season.
Toured Britain in 1972/73 before retiring in 1973. An anti-apartheid activist, Burgess declined consideration for the 1970 tour to South Africa and campaigned against the 1981 tour by the Springboks.
|-
|John Callesen ||727 ||1974–76|| 18 (4)|| High School Old Boys ♦ || || Second rower whose career was ended by back problems. Went back to the farm after excelling for both Manawatu and the All Blacks.
|-
|Lachlan Cameron ||796 ||1979–81|| 17 (5)|| Massey University || Lachie || An exciting midfielder from the Varsity club. In 1981 he played in the dramatic 3rd Test versus the Springboks at Eden Park.
|-
|Alphonsus Carroll ||217 ||1920|| 8 (0)|| Jackeytown ♣ || "Phonse" || A dairy farmer, he played his first game of rugby at aged 22 in 1917. Toured Australia in 1920. Politically 'left of centre' he was a 'conscientious objector' during World War One. Switched codes to Rugby league in 1925 and represented the Kiwis.
|-
|Sam Cockroft ||21 ||1893 || 12 (0)|| Palmerston ♣ || || Played only one season in Manawatu.
|-
|Aaron Cruden ||1105 ||2010–17 || 50 (50) || College Old Boys || || First Five-Eighth, made his All Black debut on 10 June 2010 against Ireland in New Plymouth. Cancer survivor and son of former Manawatu forward Stu Cruden.
|-
|Christian Cullen ||952 || 1996–2002 || 60 (58)|| Kia Toa || "Paekakariki Express" || One of world rugby's most talented and entertaining fullbacks of any era. Was a Wellingtonian for most of his All Black career. Shot to stardom at the 1996 Hong Kong Sevens.
|-
|Chresten Davis ||958 ||1996|| 2 (0)|| Massey University.|| "Chester" ||
|-
|Mark Donaldson ||781 ||1977–81 || 35 (13) || High School Old Boys♦ ||  "Bullet" || An inspiration to Manawatu rugby. Later coached an exciting and youthful Manawatu side in the early-90s.
In 1981, in his last touch of the ball in All Black rugby, Donaldson took a quick-thinking tap on a free kick late in the series-deciding test against South Africa. This play was instrumental in setting up Alan Hewson's famous last-minute penalty goal.[1]
|-
|Kevin Eveleigh ||740 || 1974–77 || 30 (4) || Feilding || "Hayburner" || Voted ''Rugby News 'All Black player of the tour', to South Africa, 1976.
|-
|Brian Finlay ||596 || 1959 || 1 (1) || Marist ♦ || || Debuted at aged 31. His only test against the 1959 Lions, the famous 1st test where Don Clarke's six penalty goals gave New Zealand an 18–17 win. Finlay was badly injured early but returned to the field after treatment. Due to injury was not considered for the remainder of the series.
|-
|Jack Finlay ||455 || 1946 || 1 (1) || Feilding Old Boys ♦ || || World War Two shortened his potential All Black career.
|-
|Mark Finlay ||856 || 1984 || 2 (0) || High School Old Boys ♦ || || ex PNBHS 1st XV star who toured Fiji.
|-
|William Freebairn ||554 || 1953–54 || 14 (0) || Feilding || "Stewie" || Feilding Agricultural High School.
|-
|Ken Granger ||755 || 1976 ||6 (0) || Freyberg Old Boys || "Gringo" || Manawatu stalwart who retired after a record 128 games for the province. An outstanding 1976 season earned him a winger's position on the end of year tour to Argentina. He was given the nickname 'Gringo' on this tour.
|-
|Perry Harris ||751 || 1976 || 4 (1) || Te Kawau || || Called into the injury hit All Black tour party in South Africa, two days after Manawatu's historic Ranfurly Shield win at Eden Park, in 1976. Played the 3rd test of that tour.
|-
| Bruce Hemara ||859 || 1985 || 3 (0) || Freyberg Old Boys || || Manawatu Player of the Year 1983, NZ Māori representative.  With All Black hooking incumbent, Andy Dalton, unavailable for the All Blacks' tour to Argentina in 1985, Hemara was his natural replacement.
In 1986, Dalton was away with the New Zealand Cavaliers in South Africa which allowed Hemara to win selection for the All Blacks in the first test against France. Injury prevented Hemara from making his much deserved test debut and Sean Fitzpatrick took his place. Later, Hemara became assistant coach of the Turbos (2006–10).
|-
| Jackson Hemopo ||1173 || 2018– || 1 (1) || Kia Toa || || Member of the PNBHS 1st XV. Called in to the All Blacks squad as injury cover and made his debut against France in June 2018.
|-
| Ron Horsley ||610 || 1960–64 || 3 (0) || Kia Toa || "Honest Ron" || Made his All Black debut playing for Wellington. The imposing lock forward captained Manawatu in 1962 before coaching Kia Toa.
|-
| Gary Knight ||782 ||1977–86 || 66 (36) || High School Old Boys ♦ || "Axle" || The lyric "Let them feel the power of country might" was surely written with him in mind. Famously hit by a flour bomb dropped by a protest aircraft vs South Africa at Eden Park in 1981. Won the New Zealand Rugby Player of the Year trophy in 1981.
|-
| Kent Lambert ||718 || 1972–77 || 40 (11) || Massey University ||  || Formidable prop forward. Went to Penrith Panthers in the NSWRL, 1978. Was one of the first All Blacks to publicly complain about the financial burden of amateur rugby. Was a truck driver during his playing days. Injury cut short his league career.
|-
| Ngani Laumape||1160 || 2017– || 8 (6) || Kia Toa ||  || Member of the PNBHS 1st XV. Started playing rugby league for the New Zealand Warriors. Switched back to rugby union in 2016.
|-
| Arthur Law||319 || 1925 || 4 (0) || High School Old Boys ♦ || || A farmer, he was a star for the PNBHS 1st XV for several seasons.
|-
|John Loveday ||787 || 1978 || 7 (0) || High School Old Boys ♦ || || A chiropractor by trade, he ironically suffered from a 'bad back' which limited his appearances on his one and only All Black tour: the victorious Grand Slam of 1978. He was a pivotal member of the Ranfurly Shield side in the 1970s but in 1979 he retired from rugby to concentrate on his medical career.
|-
|Rod McKenzie ||403 || 1934–38 || 35 (9) || Kia Toa || "Squire" ||
|-
|Alex McMinn ||114 || 1904 || 1 (1)|| College St Old Boys ♣ || Paddy || His Irish father was sent out to New Zealand by a London newspaper to cover the 'Māori wars' in Taranaki in 1963 and later established the Manawatu Evening Standard. Paddy's younger brother 'Archie' was also an All Black.
|-
|Archibald McMinn ||102 || 1903–05 || 10 (2) || Institute ♣ || Archie || An imposing line-out specialist with the pace of a wing three-quarter. A fishmonger who died in 1919 aged 38.
|-
|John Mowlem ||37 || 1893|| 4 (0)|| Palmerston ♣ || ||
|-
|Mick O'Callaghan ||676 || 1968 || 3 (3)|| Massey University || || A winger and crowd favourite, played for Manawatu until the 1979 season.
|-
|Geoff Old ||817 || 1980–83 || 17 (3)|| High School Old Boys ♦ || || A police officer, he was on active duty during the 1981 Springbok tour together with playing in the series deciding test at Eden Park, won 25–22 by the All Blacks.
|-
|Frank Oliver ||750 || 1976–81 || 43 (17)|| Marist ♦ || "Filth" || A welcome recruit from Southland in 1979, one year after being a member of the All Blacks historic Grand Slam winning tour of the UK and Ireland. An integral part of the 1980 NPC winning side. Selected on the centenary tour of Wales in late 1980.
|-
|Doug Rollerson ||758 || 1976–81 || 24 (8) || Massey University || || In 1980 he was player of the season in Manawatu's championship winning team and in the same year he starred on the All Blacks centenary tour to Wales. His dropped goal, which creaked over the bar against the Springboks in the dramatic 3rd Test in 1981, helped the All Blacks win this memorable series.
Shocked NZ rugby when he announced he was leaving for the North Sydney Bears in the NSWRL for the 1982 season. His subsequent professional rugby league career was considered unsuccessful, persistent injuries didn't help. He died on 3 May 2017, aged 63, after a long battle with cancer.
|-
|Kevin Schuler ||904 || 1989–95|| 13 (4) || Massey University || "Herb" ||
|-
|Mark Shaw ||810 || 1980–86|| 69 (30)|| Kia Toa || "Cowboy" || A meat worker at the Longburn Freezing Works. 
|-
|Graham Shannon||31 || 1893 || 6 (0) || Marton ♥ || ||
|-
|Aaron Smith ||1112 || 2012– || 74 (74) || Feilding || "Nugget" || Became the All Black's first choice halfback in 2013.
|-
|Sam Strahan ||657 ||1967–73|| 45 (17)|| Oroua ♦ || || Imposing second rower, formed a formidable combination with John Calleson.
|-
|Craig Wickes ||821 || 1980 || 1 (0) || Palmerston North Boys' High School || || At aged 18 years, 196 days this schoolboy winger was the 2nd youngest All Black ever, behind 17-year-old Lui Paewai in 1923. A series of knee injuries, sustained in 1981, destroyed his chance of playing for the All Blacks again and limited his provincial and club rugby future as well.
|}Bold = indicates current player

♦ = indicates a club amalgamated with another

♥ = indicates a club no longer in the Manawatu Rugby Union

♣ = a club no longer extant

All Blacks formerly from Manawatu

Manawatu players in Super Rugby

Manawatu is in the Hurricanes catchment area, along with Wanganui, Hawke's Bay, Poverty Bay, East Coast, Horowhenua Kapiti, Wairarapa-Bush and Wellington.

Current or recent Manawatu players who have played for the Hurricanes:
 Chris Eves
 Nehe Milner-Skudder
 Ngani Laumape
 Otere Black
 Liam Mitchell
 Andre Taylor
 Jamie Booth
 Fraser Armstrong

In recent times, Manawatu have also provided players to each of the other New Zealand Super Rugby franchises.

Manawatu Players who have played for the Crusaders:Michael Ala'alatoa (current)

Manawatu Players who have played for the Highlanders:
 Aaron Smith (current)
 Jason Emery 
 Maʻafu Fia 
 Johnny Leota
 Hayden Triggs
 Nick Crosswell
 Doug Tietjens

Manawatu Players who have played for the Chiefs:
 Aaron Cruden
 Michael Fitzgerald
 Asaeli Tikoirotuma
 Nick Crosswell

Manawatu players who have played for the Blues:
 Hamish Northcott

Other distinguished current and former players
 Kurt Baker – moved to Taranaki; played Super Rugby for Highlanders.
 Josh Bradnock – Foundation Turbo – Captain, 60+ Games, Hurricanes player who would have played many Super games if career was not lost to multiple tendon injuries.
 John Brady - Played 15 matches for Auckland 1960–65. Trialled for the Wallabies in 1966, but was not selected due to nationality issues.
 Hugh Blair – 1970s winger, Ranfurly Shield hero and crowd favourite, from the Varsity Club of Massey University. Instantly recognisable with his long blond hair, headband and beard. Went on to lecture at Auckland University.
 Francisco Bosch (rugby union) – (2006–08) Foundation Turbo. Represented Argentina for tests vs Chile, Japan, Samoa and South Africa in 2004–05. Also a former Sevens player for Argentina.
 Jim Carroll – The son of Manawatu All Black Alphonsus Carroll, he was an outstanding first-five eighth during Manawatu's Ranfurly Shield reign from 1976 to 1978. Scored the winning try from a charge-down in the 15–10 win over Counties in 1977. This shield defence was perhaps Manawatu's most memorable.
 Denis Clare – hooker during the Ranfurly Shield and National Championship winning era.
 Nick Crosswell – (2006–14) Foundation Turbo; Captain (2009–13); played Super Rugby for Chiefs (2013–15) having also played previously for Highlanders.
 Michael Fitzgerald (2010–14) Turbo; played Super Rugby for Chiefs
 Alan Innes – from the early Hamer years.
 Andrew McMaster – Represented the NZ Combined Services. An exciting winger who transferred to Manawatu's Ohakea Air Force Base in 1984. Prior to this he starred for Canterbury during their memorable Ranfurly Shield era (1982–85).
 Hadleigh Parkes (2010) - After relocating to Auckland in 2011 played Super Rugby for the Blues (2012), Southern Kings, South Africa (2013) and Hurricanes (2014).
 Terry Sole –  Loose forward during the early, and most successful, Hamer years.
 Alex Tatana – Midfielder – Hamer years, early to mid-1980s.
 Andre Taylor – Fullback/wing – Former Turbo, moved to Taranaki; played Super Rugby for Hurricanes.
 Hayden Triggs – Lock – Has represented the Māori All Blacks. He played Super Rugby for the Hurricanes and Highlanders. He played in Japan before returning to the Blues and North Harbour. 50+ Games for Manawatu.
 Ian Wood – Midfielder who came close to All Black selection in 1985–86. Considered unlucky not to have been selected for cancelled 1985 tour of South Africa and subsequent replacement tour to Argentina.

Coaches
 Jack Gleeson: (1965-69) - Coach of the New Zealand national under-21 rugby union team from 1975 to 1976 and the All Blacks from 1977 to 1978.
 Owen Gleeson (1970-74)
 Graham Hamer: (1975-86) - Coached the Ranfurly Shield and National Championship winning teams of the 1970s and 1980s.
 Kevin Eveleigh (1987): All Black Flanker 1974–77.
 Mark Donaldson: (1990-92) - Former All Black half-back.
 Ian Snook: (1993-94)
 Frank Oliver: (1995–97) - Later coached the Central Vikings, Hurricanes and Blues.
 Ken Maharey and Andrew McMaster (Assistant): (2001-03)
 Peter Kemp: (2004)
 Charlie McAlister: (2005)
 Dave Rennie (2006–11): Foundation Manawatu Turbos coach. Left at the end of 2011 season to become 2012 coach of Chiefs. The Chiefs subsequently won back-to-back Super Rugby titles in 2012 and 2013. Coached Australia.
 Jason O'Halloran (2011–2015): Assistant and successor of Dave Rennie. Coach of the ITM Cup Championship winning team of 2014 leading to promotion to the ITM Cup Premiership in 2015. 
 Jeremy Cotter (2016–2018): Assistant to Jason O'Halloran before being promoted to the Head Coach role. Brother of Scotland coach, Vern Cotter. 
 Peter Russell (2019 - 2022): Formerly coach of Marist St Pats (Wellington), Wairarapa Bush, Hawkes Bay, Newcastle Falcons and Japanese club NEC Green Rockets.
 Mike Rogers (2023-): Formerly assistant coach of Bay of Plenty, the Chiefs Manawa and Waikato Farah Palmer Cup teams and the New England Free Jacks.  

Support
Fans of Manawatu rugby are known throughout the rugby community in New Zealand for their habit of wearing plastic garden buckets cut to shape over their heads during matches. As such, fans of the provincial side have picked up the self-named nickname of "Bucketheads".

Theme Songs
Manawatu had two theme songs during their 'glory' years, which were played on radio '2ZA' in the days leading up to the big games on Saturday. They were:

 A Ranfurly Shield theme song 1976–78 (sung to the melody of the American civil war song When Johnny Comes Marching Home): "We're Manawatu, we've got the shield huh rah, huh rah!..."
 A later song (early 1980s) was used prior to NPC and Ranfurly Shield challenges: "We'll pass the ball and run it, green and white! And let them feel the power of country might!..."
 A much earlier song, On The Ball, was sung at Manawatu games during its foundation years and beyond. According to Manawatu rugby historian, Clive Akers, it was composed in Palmerston North by team captain Ted Secker and was 'made famous by the 1888 Native team that toured Britain'. Akers said further 'it would rate as Manawatu's greatest contribution to the rugby world'. Its chorus went: "On the Ball! On the Ball! On the Ball! Thro' scrummage, three-quarters and all, sticking together we keep on the leather, and shout as we go, On the Ball!"

Women's Rugby: Manawatu CyclonesManawatu Cyclones is the women's representative team. The Cyclones wear the same green and white tramline jersey design as the men's team.

Women's Provincial Championship
In 2005, the team was promoted from the Second Division.
In 2006, however, Manawatu did not win a game in the competition, which saw the team play against the likes of Auckland, Wellington and Otago.  Manawatu drew with Hawke's Bay.

In 2012, the Women's Provincial Championship format was a full round robin of six teams playing six rounds (each team with one bye round). The Cyclones began with a bye. Wins for the Cyclones were over Waikato, Wellington and Hawke's Bay. Unfortunately large losses to Otago and eventual finalists Auckland and Canterbury and missing crucial bonus points, meant the Cyclones did not make the post-season.

Notable Cyclones:Current Carys Dallinger
 Marilyn Live
 Rachael Rakatau
 Janna Vaughan
 Kaipo Olsen-Baker
 Selica Winiata
 Sarah GossPast'''
 Farah Palmer
 Rebecca Mahoney

NZ Rugby Museum
Palmerston North is the home of the New Zealand Rugby Museum and also the Sport & Rugby Institute at the Turitea Campus, Massey University.

References

External links
 Official Site

New Zealand rugby union teams
New Zealand rugby union governing bodies
Sport in Manawatū-Whanganui
Sport in Palmerston North
Sports organizations established in 1886